"Another Way to Die" is a song by American musicians Jack White and Alicia Keys. Written and produced by White as the theme song to the 2008 James Bond film Quantum of Solace, it was released as a single in the United States on September 30, 2008 and in Europe on October 20, 2008. The song—which features White on vocals, guitar, piano and drums and Keys on vocals—is the first duet in the Bond film series, and was nominated for Best Short Form Music Video at the 2009 Grammy Awards, with director P. R. Brown. It was also nominated for Best Song at the 2008 Critics' Choice Awards, and won Best Original Song at the Satellite Awards 2008. Commercially, the song reached number one in Finland and became a top-five hit in Austria, Norway, Scotland, and Switzerland.

The single was released as a limited edition 7-inch single of 6,000 copies in the U.S. on September 30, 2008 by White's label Third Man Records, and in the United Kingdom on October 20, 2008 by XL Recordings. It was also released as a downloadable song for the video game Guitar Hero World Tour on November 7, 2008. An instrumental version of the song was also used in a Coca-Cola commercial, as Coca-Cola Zero was used to promote the film; however, White subsequently announced that he had not approved of the song being licensed for this use. Roughly the first two minutes of the song were first played on September 13, 2008 on the radio show Siglo 21 on Radio 3 in Spain. The song premiered on British radio on September 18, 2008 on BBC Radio 1's The Jo Whiley Show. Newsbeat described the reaction from listeners who e-mailed their opinions as mixed. On October 3, 2008 the music video premiered on Channel 4.

Background
White wrote and produced the song and he plays the guitar, drums, and piano, while Keys provides vocals, becoming the first duet in Bond theme history. The pair filmed a video for the song in Toronto on September 6, 2008, whilst Keys was at the Toronto International Film Festival promoting her film The Secret Life of Bees while White was there with It Might Get Loud, a documentary on the electric guitar. Initial reviews of the song were mixed, with some critics anticipating that the song could grow in popularity the more it was played on radio and performed live. Amy Winehouse and Leona Lewis had previously been rumored as the vocalists for the Bond theme. The song is included on the Super Edition of Keys' third studio album, As I Am (2007).

Music video
The music video for the song was released on Yahoo! Video on September 29, 2008, and directed by P. R. Brown. It has since made its way onto YouTube and other video sharing sites. It can also be seen on the DVD of the film. It features White singing and playing both guitar and the drums. Keys sings and plays piano in the video. Video effects and CGI are in the background featuring wavy lines and use of dawn and dusk. A shot of Daniel Craig as James Bond appears in the very last shot, which appeared in the theatrical trailer for the film. The video was announced as a nominee for Best Short Form Music Video at the 51st Grammy Awards.

In the opening titles to the theatrical film, the song begins when Bond fires a bullet. He roams the desert aiming his gun in every direction, and slowly the sand dunes he has been patrolling become nude women in silhouette. Aside from the desert theme, there are also visual cues of the night sky, and lines of celestial navigation seen, as well as various handgun silhouettes. The main colors used in the video are black, blue, and orange.

Chart performance
On September 28, 2008, the song entered the UK Singles Chart at number twenty-six on downloads alone, and peaked at nine. Also, it became Keys' first chart-topper in Finland, and charted inside the top ten in Austria, Belgium, Denmark, Germany, Norway, and Switzerland. In Canada it debuted at number fifteen on the Canadian Hot 100 on the issue dated October 18, 2008, based on a large number of downloads.

In the United States it debuted at number eighty-one on the Billboard Hot 100 on the issue dated November 29, 2008, spending one week only on the chart.

In Australia the single made its way into the top forty, peaking at number twenty-nine for the week of December 1, 2008. "Another Way to Die" was the first James Bond theme song to feature on a Triple J Hottest 100 playlist, compiled almost every year since 1989; in 2008 the song was ranked the eighty-seventh most popular.

Critical reception
The song received some positive reviews as a standalone song, but it was subject to poor reception as a Bond theme, with Jude Rogers of The Guardian calling the song "jagged" and "awkward". Criticism focused on how the song does not seem to fit as a James Bond theme. In the 2008 Popjustice Reader's Poll, the song was voted as the second "Worst Single".

Live performance
"Another Way to Die" was included on Keys' set list on her The Freedom Tour. Neither White nor Keys performed the song on television, nor at awards ceremonies.

Track listing
CD and 7-inch single
 "Another Way to Die" – 4:23
 "Another Way to Die"  – 4:23

Personnel
Credits are taken from the record sleeve.

 Alicia Keys – vocals
 Jack White – vocals, drums, bass, guitar, producer, mixing
 Jack Lawrence – baritone guitar, bass guitar
 Laura Matula – piano
 Wayne Jackson – horns
 Jack Hale – horns
 Tom McGinley – horns
 Lindsay Smith-Trostle – cello
 Lyndsay Pruett – violin, five string violin

 Michael Rinne – double bass
 Vance Powell – engineer
 Mark Petaccia – assistant engineer
 Nathan Yarboro – assistant engineer
 Josh Smith – assistant engineer
 Vlado Meller – mastering
 The Third Man – design
 Rob Jones – design

Charts and certifications

Weekly charts

Year-end charts

Certifications and sales

Cover versions
In 2017, actor and musician Robbie Rist recorded "Another Way To Die" with his band, Ballzy Tomorrow, for the multi-artist compilation album, Songs, Bond Songs: The Music Of 007.

See also
 List of number-one singles of 2008 (Finland)
 Outline of James Bond

References

External links
 Another Way to Die at Discogs

2008 singles
Alicia Keys songs
Jack White songs
Number-one singles in Finland
Quantum of Solace
Songs from James Bond films
Songs written by Jack White
Male–female vocal duets
Third Man Records singles
J Records singles
XL Recordings singles
2008 songs
Song recordings produced by Alicia Keys